Marlene Favela (born Silvia Marlene Favela Meraz on August 5, 1977, in Santiago Papasquiaro, Durango, Mexico) is a Mexican actress and model. In Mexican television, as of 2013 she was best known as Esmeralda in the TV show Zorro, La Espada y la Rosa.

In 2013, she appeared as an award presenter at the Billboard Mexican Music Awards.

On December 12, 2017, Favela married George Seely, at a hacienda in San Juan del Río, Querétaro, Mexico.

Filmography

Films

Television

Awards and nominations

Premios ACE

Premios El Heraldo de México

Premios TVyNovelas

Miami Life Awards 

 Magazine People en español named by "50 most beautiful faces in the world of artistic"
 Receive her star Paseo de las luminarias of Mexico

References

External links

1976 births
Living people
Mexican telenovela actresses
Mexican television actresses
Mexican film actresses
Mexican stage actresses
Mexican female models
Actresses from Durango
People from Santiago Papasquiaro
20th-century Mexican actresses
21st-century Mexican actresses